Life in Philadelphia was a series of satirical cartoons drawn and engraved by Edward Williams Clay between 1828 and 1830. He modeled them after the British series Life in London (1821), by George and Robert Cruikshank. The Cruikshank cartoons had mocked supposed class differences; Clay's cartoons mocked supposed racial differences. 

The cartoons were highly popular, and were copied by artists in New York and London. Life in Philadelphia perpetuated a racist stereotype of hyper-elegant blacks, that became a standard trope of minstrel shows in the mid- to late-nineteenth century.

Background
Edward Williams Clay was a Philadelphia lawyer and fashion illustrator, who became the most prolific political cartoonist of the Jacksonian Era.

The first edition of Life in Philadelphia was published by William Simpson and Susan Hart in Philadelphia, and consisted of fourteen cartoons. Simpson published the first eleven in 1828 and 1829, and Hart the last three in 1829 and 1830. Hart reprinted the entire 14-cartoon series as color aquatints in 1830. She also published other Clay cartoons, that later were added to the London editions of Life in Philadelphia.

Four cartoons in the original series depicted only whites and nine depicted only blacks. They interacted only in Plate 11: a middle-aged black woman inquiring of a young white French shopkeeper about purchasing "flesh coloured silk stockings." Clay's lampoons of white Philadelphians were gentle, and depicted a promenade in the park, a costume ball, an awkward courtship between staid Quakers, and an absurdly dressed woman being mistaken for a prostitute. Clay's lampoons of black Philadelphians were more biting, and ridiculed the supposed fancy dress, pretentious manners, snobbery, and malaprop-filled "black speech" of the city's small but visible black middle class. "The cartoons were so popular that the term 'Life in Philadelphia' became a standard phrase to refer to fashions, trends, and—most especially—black Philadelphians' social practices and sartorial choices." 

Clay's cartoons were indicative of both the white supremacy and class insecurity of the Jacksonian Era, a time when abolitionism and free blacks were perceived as threats to both American slaveholders and the white working class.

Although no complete copy of the first edition of Life in Philadelphia is known to exist, the Library Company of Philadelphia holds examples of all fourteen cartoons, ten of them from the first edition.

London editions
Harrison Isaacs published the first London edition of Life in Philadelphia, 1831. He hired artist William Summers to redraw Clay's cartoons, enlarging the images by about 50%. Summers improved them by adding depth and detail, and by placing each within a rectangular border. Eleven cartoons from the original series were redrawn and enlarged, two of them depicting only whites, and Isaacs expanded the series with Summers's own cartoons, depicting only blacks. The cartoons were engraved by Summers and Charles Hunt; and printed by Isaacs, and later by Gabriel Shear Tregear and others.
"While the successful transfer of Clay's cartoons was attributable in part to the shared cultural backgrounds and common understandings of London and Philadelphia, the London cartoons took on a new meaning and form. London artists like Isaacs, Summers, Hunt, and Tregear made changes that signposted shifts in the cartoons' meanings, exaggerated the features of Philadelphian blacks even more grotesquely than had Clay, rendering them more bestial in anatomy and features."

Isaacs later removed the two cartoons depicting only whites from the series, and replaced them with other Clay cartoons depicting blacks. A cartoon depicting African Americans celebrating the 1808 end of the Slave Trade was added to coincide with the 1833 abolition of slavery in the British colonies. This was credited as: "Drawn & Eng'd by I. Harris," but scholars now attribute it to Clay. By the end of 1833, all twenty cartoons in the London edition depicted African Americans. 

The twenty African-American cartoons were reprinted in 1834, in Tregear's Black Jokes: being a Series of Laughable Caricatures on the March of Manners Amongst the Blacks. The twenty cartoons were reprinted in 1860, by publishers T. C. Lewis & Co., London.

The Library Company of Philadelphia holds a large collection of Life in Philadelphia cartoons, from both the Philadelphia and London editions.

Original series

London editions

Related works

See also

Bourgeoisie
Tregear's Black Jokes

References

Culture of Philadelphia
Stereotypes of African Americans
Anti-black racism in the United Kingdom